Siegfried Schulz (born 2 July 1910, date of death unknown) was a German athlete. He competed in the men's pole vault at the 1936 Summer Olympics.

References

1910 births
Year of death missing
Athletes (track and field) at the 1936 Summer Olympics
German male pole vaulters
Olympic athletes of Germany
Place of birth missing